Nycteroleterinae is a subfamily of procolophonian parareptiles from the Middle Permian of Asia and North America.

References 

Prehistoric reptile taxonomy
Reptile subfamilies